Sassandra-Marahoué District is one of fourteen administrative districts of Ivory Coast. The district is located in the central part of the country. The capital of the district is Daloa.

Creation
Sassandra-Marahoué District was created in a 2011 administrative reorganisation of the subdivisions of Ivory Coast. The territory of the district was composed by merging the regions of Haut-Sassandra and Marahoué.

Administrative divisions
Sassandra-Marahoué District is currently subdivided into two regions and the following departments:
 Haut-Sassandra Region (region seat also in Daloa)
 Daloa Department
 Issia Department
 Vavoua Department
 Zoukougbeu Department
 Marahoué Region (region seat in Bouaflé)
 Bouaflé Department
 Sinfra Department
 Zuénoula Department

Population
According to the 2021 census, Sassandra-Marahoué District has a population of 2,720,876, making it the third most populous district in Ivory Coast, behind Abidjan Autonomous District and Montagnes District.

References

 
Districts of Ivory Coast
States and territories established in 2011